David Vincent Hajek (born October 14, 1967) is a former infielder in Major League Baseball who played from 1995 to 1996 for the Houston Astros.

A native of Roseville, California, Hajek attended San Juan High School and California State Polytechnic University, Pomona. In 1988, he played collegiate summer baseball with the Chatham A's of the Cape Cod Baseball League. He was signed by the Astros as an amateur free agent in 1989, and appeared in 13 games for the big league club in 1995 and 1996.

References

External links
, or Retrosheet, or Pelota Binaria (Venezuelan Winter League)

1967 births
Living people
Asheville Tourists players
Baseball players from California
Cal Poly Pomona Broncos baseball players
Chatham Anglers players
Colorado Springs Sky Sox players
Houston Astros players
Jackson Generals (Texas League) players
Las Vegas Stars (baseball) players
Major League Baseball infielders
Minor league baseball coaches
Navegantes del Magallanes players
American expatriate baseball players in Venezuela
Osceola Astros players
Sportspeople from Roseville, California
Toledo Mud Hens players
Tucson Toros players